Yeshua is the Hebrew name ישוע, an ancient common variant of Yehoshua יהושע (equivalent to English Joshua or Jeshua). It may also refer to:

 Jesus, whose English name comes from the Hebrew "Yeshua" via the Greek "Iesous"
 Yahshua, one proposed transliteration of the original Hebrew or Aramaic name of Jesus commonly used by individuals in the Sacred Name Movement
 Yahshuah, a constructed form of the Hebrew name of Jesus originally found in the works of Kircher and Grossschedel and other late Renaissance esoteric sources
 Yeshu, the name of an individual or individuals mentioned in rabbinic literature, which historically has been assumed to be a reference to Jesus when used in the Talmud
 Yehoshua (disambiguation), the Hebrew name יהושע (equivalent to English Joshua)

Yeshua may also refer to:
 Yeshua ben Sira, ישוע בן סירא (equivalent to English Jesus Son of Sirach), alternate name of Ben Sira, the 2nd century BCE author of the Book of Sirach
 Ilan Yeshua (fl. 2000s), business manager
 Yeshu, Indian television series about Christ Child broadcast on &TV

See also
 Jesus (disambiguation)
 Joshua
 Yesha, geographical acronym